David King (born December 27, 1989) is a former American football defensive end. He was drafted by the Philadelphia Eagles in the seventh round of the 2013 NFL Draft after playing college football at Oklahoma.

Professional career

Philadelphia Eagles
King was selected by the Philadelphia Eagles in the seventh round (239th) of the 2013 NFL draft. On October 22, 2013, King was signed to the practice squad. On January 6, 2014, he was signed a future contract. On August 30, 2014, King was waived by the Eagles. On August 31, he was signed to the practice squad.

Seattle Seahawks
On December 11, 2014, King was signed to the Seattle Seahawks from the Eagles practice squad. On November 16, 2015, he was waived by the Seahawks.

Kansas City Chiefs
On November 17, 2015, King was claimed off waivers by the Kansas City Chiefs from the Seahawks. On September 3, 2016, he was released by the Chiefs. The next day, he was signed to the Chiefs' practice squad. He was promoted to the active roster on November 5, 2016, but was released on November 14 and re-signed to the practice squad. He was promoted back to the active roster on December 17, 2016. He was waived on December 30, 2016, and was re-signed back to the practice squad. He signed a reserve/future contract with the Chiefs on January 19, 2017.

Tennessee Titans
On September 1, 2017, King was traded to the Tennessee Titans for a 2018 seventh round draft pick.

On September 1, 2018, King was released by the Titans.

References

External links
Career transactions

Living people
1989 births
Players of American football from Houston
American football defensive ends
African-American players of American football
Oklahoma Sooners football players
Philadelphia Eagles players
Cincinnati Bengals players
Seattle Seahawks players
Kansas City Chiefs players
Tennessee Titans players
Strake Jesuit College Preparatory alumni
21st-century African-American sportspeople
20th-century African-American people